Métropole du Grand Nancy is the métropole, an intercommunal structure, centred on the city of Nancy. It is located in the Meurthe-et-Moselle department, in the Grand Est region, northeastern France. It was created in July 2016, replacing the previous Communauté urbaine du Grand Nancy. Its area is 142.3 km2. Its population was 257,431 in 2018, of which 104,885 in Nancy proper.

History 
The Urban Community of Greater Nancy (French: Communauté urbaine du Grand Nancy), was created in 1996. On July 1, 2016, the Metropolitan community replaced the Urban Community in accordance with a decree of April 2016.

Member communes
The 20 communes of the metropolis are:

Art-sur-Meurthe
Dommartemont
Essey-lès-Nancy
Fléville-devant-Nancy
Heillecourt
Houdemont
Jarville-la-Malgrange
Laneuveville-devant-Nancy
Laxou
Ludres
Malzéville
Maxéville
Nancy
Pulnoy
Saint-Max
Saulxures-lès-Nancy
Seichamps
Tomblaine
Vandœuvre-lès-Nancy
Villers-lès-Nancy

Administration 
The Metropolitan Council consists of 80 members, one of them being the president, currently André Rossinot, the former mayor of Nancy.

References

External links
 Greater Nancy website

Nancy
Intercommunalities of Meurthe-et-Moselle
Nancy, France